The Fisher School Bridge is a covered bridge in Lincoln County in the U.S. state of Oregon. The  Howe truss structure crosses a stream called Five Rivers near the rural community of Fisher in the Central Oregon Coast Range. Closed to vehicles, it is a pedestrian bridge.

The bridge takes its name from Fisher Elementary School, which was nearby but no longer exists. Alternatively, the bridge is sometimes called Five Rivers Bridge. It is the only remaining covered bridge in the Five Rivers basin.

Conflicting county records give the date of construction as either 1919 or 1927, but the county's official date is 1919. Features include semi-elliptical portal arches, ribbon windows under the eaves, and flared side walls. The structure was added to the National Register of Historic Places in 1979.

Scheduled for demolition in the 1970s after replacement by a concrete bridge, the Fisher School Bridge was preserved by the local community with the aid of Lincoln County. In 1998, an inspection showed that the bridge had become unsafe and would need to be demolished or renovated. A federal grant obtained in 2001 with help from the Oregon Department of Transportation paid for most of the renovation, including new floor beams, deck, siding, roof, and other components, and red paint.

See also
List of bridges documented by the Historic American Engineering Record in Oregon
List of bridges on the National Register of Historic Places in Oregon
List of Oregon covered bridges

References

External links

Alsea River
Bridges in Lincoln County, Oregon
Pedestrian bridges in Oregon
Wooden bridges in Oregon
Bridges completed in 1919
Covered bridges on the National Register of Historic Places in Oregon
National Register of Historic Places in Lincoln County, Oregon
Road bridges on the National Register of Historic Places in Oregon
1919 establishments in Oregon
Tourist attractions in Lincoln County, Oregon
Historic American Engineering Record in Oregon